Trophon iarae is a species of sea snail, a marine gastropod mollusk in the family Muricidae, the murex snails or rock snails.

Description
The shell can grow to be  in length.

Distribution
It can be found off of southern Brazil, Uruguay, and the Falkland Islands.

References

Gastropods described in 1998
Trophon